Robert Paul Holdstock (2 August 1948 – 29 November 2009) was an English novelist and author best known for his works of Celtic, Nordic, Gothic and Pictish fantasy literature, predominantly in the fantasy subgenre of mythic fiction.

Holdstock broke into print in 1968. His science fiction and fantasy works explore philosophical, psychological, anthropological, spiritual and woodland themes. He received three BSFA awards and won the World Fantasy Award in the category of Best Novel of 1985.

Early life
Robert Holdstock, the eldest of five children, was born in Hythe, Kent. His father, Robert Frank Holdstock, was a police officer and his mother, Kathleen Madeline Holdstock, was a nurse. At the age of seven he started attending Gillingham Grammar School in the Medway Towns. He recalled that as a young adult he had jobs including banana boatman, construction worker and slate miner. 

Holdstock earned a Bachelor of Science from University College of North Wales, Bangor, with honours in applied Zoology (1967–1970). He continued his education, earning a Master of Science in Medical Zoology at the London School of Hygiene & Tropical Medicine in 1971. He conducted research at the Medical Research Council in London from 1971 to 1974, while also doing part-time writing and producing a science fiction fanzine. He became a full-time writer during 1976 and lived out the rest of his life in North London.

Career

Holdstock's first published story, "Pauper's Plot", appeared in the magazine New Worlds in 1968. His first novel was a science fiction work, Eye Among the Blind, published in 1976.

During the late 1970s and throughout the 1980s Holdstock wrote many fantasy and science fiction novels along with a number of short stories, most of which were published under a pseudonym. Robert Holdstock's pseudonyms included Robert Faulcon, Chris Carlsen, Richard Kirk, Robert Black, Ken Blake, and Steven Eisler. These included some adaptions of television scripts for novelisations of television series including The Professionals. During this same period he wrote the text for Space Wars, Worlds and Weapons, a large format book in which he provided essays concerning the tropes of science fiction (and, in one chapter, sword and sorcery), accompanied by colour reproductions of related artwork.

In 1980 Holdstock wrote Tour of the Universe with Malcolm Edwards. The rights were subsequently sold for a space shuttle simulation ride at the CN Tower, also called the Tour of the Universe.

Holdstock wrote The Dark Wheel, the first novella to be included for distribution with a video game, Elite, in 1984. He wrote an adaptation of The Emerald Forest, a film directed by John Boorman, and novelised episodes of the Granada Television series Bulman.

Holdstock's breakthrough novel Mythago Wood was published in 1984. It began the Ryhope Wood series, which continued until the appearance of Avilion in 2009.

Holdstock was guest of honour at the annual Novacon in 1984, and a limited-edition chapbook featuring his fantasy story 'Thorn' was presented to the first 500 attendees.

Between 2001 and 2007 Holdstock produced a trilogy of fantasy novels, the Merlin Codex, consisting of Celtika, The Iron Grail and The Broken Kings.

Holdstock wrote, edited or contributed to a number of nonfiction works, including Alien Landscapes, Tour of the Universe, Horror: 100 Best Novels and Encyclopedia of Science Fiction (a different publication than The Encyclopedia of Science Fiction published in 1979, edited by Peter Nicholls).

Death
Holdstock died in hospital on 29 November 2009 at the age of 61, having been in intensive care since his collapse with an E. coli infection on 18 November 2009.

In 2013 a joint volume of poetry with Garry Kilworth (with whom he collaborated on the award-winning novella "The Ragthorn") was published by PS Publishing, Poems, Peoms and Other Atrocities.

Critical reception
David Pringle described Eye Among the Blind, Holdstock's first science fiction novel, as a "dogged, detailed, somewhat slow-moving planetary mystery". Ursula K. Le Guin called the same novel "As strong a treatment of a central theme of science fiction – alienness, and the relation of the human and the alien – as any I have read."

According to Michael D. C. Drout, Holdstock's Ryhope Wood series is a significant part of the fantasy genre, displaying the power and aesthetic standards of Tolkien's fantasy without being either a "close imitation of" or a "reaction against" Tolkien. Drout considers Holdstock, along with Ursula K. Le Guin, a worthy inheritor of the fantasy tradition created by Tolkien. Patrick Curry placed Holdstock in a quartet of noteworthy fantasy authors, alongside Le Guin, John Crowley and Marion Zimmer Bradley, for writing fantasy books that come close to Tolkien's breadth and depth of imagination, and "in some respects surpass Tolkien".

David Langford offers praise for most of Holdstock's work, but regarded Merlin's Wood less highly: "the overall narrative is flawed, distorted by its weight of undeserved loss and inaccessible healing".

Book covers
The covers of Holdstock's books were produced by a variety of illustrators. The original UK and US covers of Mythago Wood were illustrated by Eddi Gornall and Christopher Zacharow, respectively; Geoff Taylor illustrated the original UK covers for the Mythago Wood sequels Lavondyss, The Bone Forest, The Hollowing and Merlin's Wood. Illustrators of subsequent covers and editions include Jim Burns, Tom Canty, John Howe, Alan Lee, John Jude Palencar, Larry Rostant and Ron Walotsky. John Howe stated: "Holdstock is to me one of the best Celtic fantasy authors alive today."

Awards 
 The novella Mythago Wood won the BSFA Award for Best Short Story in 1981 along with the World Fantasy Award for Best Novella in 1982.
 The novel Mythago Wood won the BSFA Award for Best Novel in 1984 along with the World Fantasy Award for Best Novel in 1985. Mythago Wood was published as part of the Masterpieces of Fantasy series by Easton Press, who describe themselves as releasing 'works of lasting meaning, beauty and importance.'
 Lavondyss won the BSFA Award for Best Novel in 1988.
 The Bone Forest was nominated for the World Fantasy Award in the category of Best Collection in 1992.
 The Ragthorn, coauthored with Garry Kilworth, won the World Fantasy Award in the category of Best Novella in 1992 and was nominated for the BSFA Award for Best Novel in 1994.
 The Fetch won the HOMer Award for horror novel in 1992.
 The Iron Grail won the Czech Academy of Science Fiction Fantasy and Horror Award in the category of Best Novel in 2002.
 La Forêt des Mythagos, i.e. the Mythago Wood collection, won the Grand Prix de l'Imaginaire in the category of Prix spécial in 2003.
 The short story "Scarrowfell" in Dans la vallée des statues & autres récits (Denoël, 2004), translated into French by Philippe Gindre, won the Imaginales award (Prix Imaginales) in the Short Story category in 2004.
 Celtika won the Grand Prix de l'Imaginaire in the Foreign Language Novel category in 2004.

Select bibliography 

Ryhope Wood series
 Mythago Wood
 Lavondyss
 The Bone Forest, a novella and short story collection
 The Hollowing
 Merlin's Wood, a novel and two short stories (only published in the UK)
 Gate of Ivory, Gate of Horn
 Avilion

Merlin Codex series
 Celtika
 The Iron Grail
 The Broken Kings

Night Hunter series (as Robert Faulcon)
 The Stalking
 The Talisman
 The Ghost Dance
 The Shrine
 The Hexing
 The Labyrinth

Other novels
 Eye Among the Blind
 Earthwind
 Necromancer
 Where Time Winds Blow
 In the Valley of the Statues (short story collection)
 The Emerald Forest (film novelisation)
 The Fetch (also published under the title Unknown Regions)
 Ancient Echoes
 The Dark Wheel computer game novella included in Elite

References

Sources

External links 
 Bibliography at SciFan
 Robert Holdstock page at Gollancz Imprint's publishing group, Orion Publishing
 
 
 Robert Holdstock at Fantasy Literature
 Robert Holdstock's website

1948 births
2009 deaths
20th-century British short story writers
21st-century British short story writers
20th-century English novelists
21st-century English novelists
Alumni of Bangor University
Alumni of the London School of Hygiene & Tropical Medicine
English fantasy writers
English male novelists
English science fiction writers
English short story writers
People educated at Gillingham Grammar School, Kent
People from Hythe, Kent
World Fantasy Award-winning writers
Writers of modern Arthurian fiction